Swanandi Tikekar (born 13 November) is a Marathi actress. She is daughter of Uday Tikekar and Arati Ankalikar-Tikekar. She known for her performance in Zee Marathi's Dil Dosti Duniyadari as Meenal Shewale and Dil Dosti Dobara as Mukta.

Career 
She pursued master's degree in law from ILS Law College. She is well known for her role as Meenal Shewale in Dil Dosti Duniyadari, Mukta in Dil Dosti Dobara and Sakhi in Assa Maher Nako Ga Bai. She was also seen in the plays Ek Shoonya Teen and Don't Worry Be Happy. 

She is the 1st winner of the popular singing contest Singing Star. In 2021, she hosting the Sony Marathi's Indian Idol Marathi.

Television

References

External links
 

Living people
Actresses from Maharashtra
Actresses in Marathi cinema
1990 births